Rodrigo Rafael Vásquez Schroeder (born December 6, 1969) is a Chilean chess player holding the title of grandmaster. He was the Chilean chess champion in 1989, 1992 and 2004.

Chess career
Vásquez Schroder played for Chile in the Chess Olympiads of 1990, 1998, 2004, 2010 and 2012. He played in the FIDE World Chess Championship 2004 and was eliminated in the first round by Francisco Vallejo Pons.

References

External links
 
 

1969 births
Living people
Chilean chess players
Chess grandmasters
Chess Olympiad competitors
Place of birth missing (living people)